Dov Forman (born 6 December 2003) is an English best-selling author, spokesperson and social media creator.

Personal life

Forman is a religious Jew of Ashkenazi descent. He is the youngest of three children, one of Holocaust survivor Lily Ebert's 36 great-grandchildren, and lives in northwest London.

Activism and social media 
Aged 16, during the COVID-19 pandemic and amid a rise of Antisemitism, Forman wanted to raise awareness of the Holocaust and anti-Jewish racism. He used Twitter to share his great-grandmother's story of surviving the Holocaust; his Tweets reached over 70 million Twitter users in 2020 and 2021.

Forman has advocated new ways to teach young people about the Holocaust, and worked with the LADbible Group and Twitch.Tv to bring Holocaust survivors to their platforms. Forman was invited to speak about 'Social Media and Holocaust Commemoration' to the CEO of Google, at Oxford University and Cambridge University, and Dov has also spoken to more than 150 news outlets in over 30 countries. 

In November 2020, Forman spoke to a UK Parliamentary committee in favour of a UK Holocaust Memorial. In February 2021, Forman set up a TikTok account to raise awareness among people his own age about the Holocaust and the consequences of hate. Forman posted videos with his great-grandmother answering questions about the Holocaust and Judaism. In June 2021, the pair reached one million TikTok followers.

Forman has worked on educational projects with several UK government departments - including the Foreign Office, Department for Education, and the Department for Levelling Up, Housing and Communities - and international organisations, including the United Nations.

In November 2021, Forman - with Jewish News - set up a private meeting and a tour of Kinloss synagogue with former Yorkshire County Cricket Club player Azeem Rafiq. Rafiq, who testified to Parliament earlier that month about anti-Muslim prejudice at Yorkshire, was later revealed to have used hateful language towards Jews on social media in 2011. Forman set up this meeting as part of Rafiq's reconciliation with the Jewish community.

In March 2022, Forman was announced as a 'young spokesperson' for the USC Shoah Foundation, the archive of Holocaust survivor testimonies initiated by Steven Spielberg in 1994.

Book
Dov co-authored Lily's Promise: How I Survived Auschwitz and Found the Strength to Live, published by Pan Macmillan in the UK on 2 September 2021 and by HarperCollins in the US on 10 May 2022. Lily's Promise is a five-time Sunday Times bestseller and was the Waterstones and Daily Mail best history book of 2021. In March 2022, Lily's Promise (Lily's Belofte) became a bestseller in Holland.

The United States edition of Lily's Promise is a two-time New York Times bestseller, debuting at number 2 - in its first week, and was chosen as the Costco US buyers' pick for May 2022.

In a foreword to Lily's Promise, King Charles III  paid tribute to Forman for his "engaging and effective use of social media". He said Forman had "demonstrated a determination to share his great grandmother’s story with a global audience".

Ted Talk
Forman delivered a Ted Talk, titled: ‘Anything is Possible - The Accidental Gamechanger’, in August 2022, at a TEDx event with the theme 'Game Changers and Disruptive Thinkers.'.

Awards
In November 2021, Forman received the Points of Light award from the UK Prime Minister at 10 Downing Street, for services to Holocaust education.

In March 2022, Forman - alongside his great-grandmother Ebert - was presented with the Jewish Care community award by Andrew Neil at the Jewish Care Topland annual community business lunch, hosted by the Topland Group.

References

External links
 

Living people
British TikTokers
2003 births
21st-century British writers
British memoirists
Jewish British activists
Holocaust historiography
British religious writers
British people of Hungarian-Jewish descent
Writers on antisemitism
British Jewish writers
Writers from London
21st-century British Jews